Arminou is a village in the Paphos District of Cyprus, located 5 km north of Salamiou on the F617 road from Filousa to Mandria. The village is on the Dhiarizos River which is second in terms of flow river in Cyprus. The Arminou Dam, an earthfill structure, is built in the Diarizos river and was inaugurated in December 1998. According to data provided by the Ministry of Agriculture, Natural Resources and Environment, the dam's capacity is 4.3 million cubic metres, with a height of 40 metres and a length of 194 metres.

History

Two stories are told regarding the naming of the village:

The first version links the naming of the village to the name of the first resident. In particular, the first resident of the village was called Arminos and therefore the village was named Arminou.
The second version which is the most likely one, originates the name from the name Hermione which was the name of an ancient Greek city in South Greece.

There is a third version which says that the village was founded by Armenians, but no Armenian names or any other sign of Armenian civilization was found in the area so it is very unlikely.

The main church of Arminou is dedicated to Agia Marina. Also located in Arminou is the now almost totally destroyed Holy Monastery of Timios Stavros which dates back to the middle of the 18th century. Nowadays only a small church and the wall surrounding the yard are preserved.

In the 2011 Municipal elections, Andreas Petrou was voted 'muhtar' or Community President with 30 votes out of 42 registered voters.

Arminou has a small disused copper mine. Notably, in 2011 the Canadian corporation Northern Lion announced that after a preliminary airborne geophysical survey in the Arminou region it has discovered gold assays of up to 49.5grms per ton.

Demetrakis G. Stylianides, ex-President of the Supreme Court of the Republic of Cyprus and notable legal professional, was born in Arminou in 1927.

Dr. Thalis Michaelides, a well-known Surgeon and former parliament member of the Republic of Cyprus originates from the village of Arminou where he was born in 1927.

XORKO Collaborative Arts Movement held two non-profit art festivals in the village in July 2012 and August 2013, ran by volunteers.

Population

The population of Arminou has rapidly declined in the last 70 years:

References

Communities in Paphos District